Punk was a music magazine and fanzine created by cartoonist John Holmstrom, publisher Ged Dunn, and "resident punk" Legs McNeil in 1975. Its use of the term "punk rock", coined by writers for Creem magazine a few years earlier to describe the simplistic and crude style of '60s garage rock bands, further popularized the term.  The founders were influenced by their affection for comic books and the music of The Stooges, the New York Dolls, and The Dictators. Holmstrom later called it "the print version of The Ramones".  It was also the first publication to popularize the CBGB scene.

Punk published 15 issues between 1976 and 1979, as well as a special issue in 1981 (The D.O.A. Filmbook), a 25th anniversary special in 2001 and 3 final issues in 2007.

Punk was a vehicle for examining the underground music scene in New York, and primarily for punk rock as found in clubs like CBGB, Zeppz, and Max's Kansas City. It mixed Mad Magazine-style cartooning by Holmstrom, Bobby London and a young Peter Bagge with the more straightforward pop journalism of the kind found in Creem. It also provided an outlet for female writers, artists and photographers who had been shut out of a male-dominated underground publishing scene.

Punk magazine was home to (many of whom were being published for the first time) writers Mary Harron, Steve Taylor, Lester Bangs, Pam Brown, artists Buz Vaultz, Anya Phillips, and Screaming Mad George, and photographers Bob Gruen, Barak Berkowitz, Roberta Bayley and David Godlis. After Dunn left in early 1977 and McNeil quit shortly afterwards, Bruce Carleton (art director, 1977–1979), Ken Weiner (contributor, 1977–79), and Elin Wilder, one of few African Americans involved in the early CBGB/punk rock scene, were added to the staff.

Issues 

A complete list of issues
 

There were no issues 9, 13 or 18

References

External links
 
John Holmstrom Papers and Punk Magazine Records. General Collection, Beinecke Rare Book and Manuscript Library, Yale University.

Music magazines published in the United States
Magazines established in 1976
Magazines disestablished in 1979
Punk zines
Defunct magazines published in the United States
Magazines published in New York City
Rock music mass media